Norman Perry (born May 10, 1938) is an American former professional tennis player.

Tennis career
A native of Los Angeles, Perry captained the UCLA Bruins in varsity tennis and was a three-time All-American. 

Perry, on tour in the 1960s and 1970s, made singles third rounds at the French and U.S. championships. In reaching the third round at Roland Garros in 1964 he had a win over Nicholas Kalogeropoulos, 11–9 in the fifth set. He featured in the Wimbledon main draw as a mixed doubles player.

Persona life
Perry is the younger brother of tennis player Bob Perry.

References

External links
 
 

1938 births
Living people
American male tennis players
UCLA Bruins men's tennis players
Tennis players from Los Angeles